Antoniu is a given name and a surname. Notable people with this name include the following:

Given name
Antoniu Buci (born 1990), Romanian weightlifter
Antoniu Vasile (born 1942), Romanian boxer

Surname
Costache Antoniu (1900–1979), Romanian actor
Kristaq Antoniu, also known as Cristache Antoniu, (1907 – 1979), Romanian singer and actor

See also

Antoni
Antonia
Antonic
Antonie
Antonik
Antonin
Antonio
Antonis
Antonius